Shave is an English surname. Notable people with this surname include the following:

 Justin Shave (born 1973), Australian composer and music producer
 Kenneth Shave (1916–2009), Australian soldier, businessman and benefactor of the arts
 Jon Shave (born 1967), American baseball player

English-language surnames